Henry Edmund Patton (1 July 1867 – 28 April 1943)  was the 10th Bishop of Killaloe, Kilfenora, Clonfert and Kilmacduagh.

Educated at Trinity College, Dublin and  ordained in 1892, his first post was as  Chaplain to the Lord Lieutenant of Dublin. Later he held incumbencies at Donaghpatrick, Blackrock and Birr before his ordination to the episcopate in 1924.  He died in post.

References

1867 births
Alumni of Trinity College Dublin
20th-century Anglican bishops in Ireland
Bishops of Killaloe and Clonfert
1943 deaths